Khazri Buzovna was an Azerbaijan football club from Buzovna. The team participated in the Azerbaijan Premier League between 1994 and 1998.

They went into liquidation during the 1997–98 season and were finally dissolved in 1998.

Domestic history

Khazri withdrew after 8 rounds

European cup history
Q = Qualifying

Football clubs in Azerbaijan
1998 disestablishments in Azerbaijan
Defunct football clubs in Azerbaijan